Michael Joseph Shea  (March 10, 1867 – August 22, 1927), was a professional baseball player who played pitcher in the Major Leagues for the Cincinnati Red Stockings. He started and pitched two complete games for the Red Stockings during the 1887 baseball season. He allowed 13 earned runs in his 16.2 innings of work, with no strikeouts and 10 walks. He remained active in the minor leagues through 1896 in various southern leagues.

External links

1867 births
1927 deaths
Major League Baseball pitchers
Baseball players from Louisiana
Cincinnati Red Stockings (AA) players
19th-century baseball players
Memphis Grays players
Kansas City Cowboys (minor league) players
Houston Babies players
Houston Red Stockings players
New Orleans Pelicans (baseball) players
Galveston Giants players
Fort Worth Panthers players
Houston Mudcats players
Birmingham Grays players
Birmingham Blues players
Montgomery Colts players
Atlanta Crackers players
Robert E. Lee's players